St. Paul Street station is a light rail surface stop on the MBTA Green Line C branch, located in the median of Beacon Street at St. Paul Street in Brookline, Massachusetts. St. Paul Street has of two staggered side platforms which serve the C branch's two tracks; the inbound platform is to the west of the intersection, and the outbound platform to the east.

Track work in 2018–19, which included replacement of platform edges at several stops, triggered requirements for accessibility modifications at those stops. By December 2022, design for St. Paul Street and seven other C Branch stations was 15% complete, with construction expected to take place in 2024.

References

External links

MBTA - St. Paul Street
Station from St Paul Street from Google Maps Street View

Green Line (MBTA) stations
Railway stations in Brookline, Massachusetts